Reads Landing is an unincorporated community in Pepin Township, Wabasha County, Minnesota, United States, along the Mississippi River. The community is located between Lake City and Wabasha along U.S. Highway 61 at the junction with Wabasha County Road 77 and near Wabasha, Lake City, Camp Lacupolis, and Maple Springs. Reads Landing is located within section 24 of Pepin Township.

History
Reads Landing was platted in 1856.  Around 1878, the community had various commercial and transportation buildings, but later those businesses moved to Wabasha. The post office began in 1850 and still operates today.  At one time, Reads Landing was considered a possible site for the Minnesota state capital.

The community contains one property listed on the National Register of Historic Places: the 1870 Reads Landing School.  The school building now houses the Wabasha County Historical Society Museum.

Notable people
 James Huff Stout (1848–1910), former Wisconsin legislator and businessman; lived in Reads Landing.

References

Former municipalities in Minnesota
Unincorporated communities in Minnesota
Unincorporated communities in Wabasha County, Minnesota
Rochester metropolitan area, Minnesota
Minnesota populated places on the Mississippi River